Rose Hall Lighthouse is a lighthouse on the northernmost tip of Jamaica.

It is maintained by the Port Authority of Jamaica, an agency of the Ministry of Transport and Works.

See also

List of lighthouses in Jamaica

References

External links
 Aerial view.
 Port Authority of Jamaica
 Ministry of Transport and Works

Lighthouses in Jamaica
Buildings and structures in Saint James Parish, Jamaica